United Television Ghana Limited (UTV Ghana) is a private, free-to-air television broadcaster in Ghana. It was launched in 2013 by The Despite Group of Companies, headed by Dr. Osei Kwame Despite. UTV Ghana airs and produces a variety of television programmes including news bulletins, dramas and successful telenovelas, films and other entertainment.

Awards
 Health Advocate–Media Institution, awarded at the 2017 People's Choice Practitioners Honours by Media Men Ghana
Radio and Television Personalities Awards TV Station Of The Year 2019–2020.

See also
Media of Ghana

Programs
The Real News
Adehye Nsroma

External links
UTV on Peace Fm online

References

Broadcasting in Ghana
Television channels and stations established in 1997
Television stations in Ghana
Mass media in Accra